Fragility is a 2016 Swedish documentary film directed by Ahang Bashi.

Synopsis
Just when her career is at its peak, the filmmaker Ahang Bashi falls into a deep hole of panic disorder and depression. With the camera as her companion, Ahang explores anxiety's vertiginous world of both darkness and hope. The film depicts her worst moments as well as the most loving gestures from the surroundings. It also takes us back in time, to her escape to Sweden and to the little girl who didn't understand. In 2016 the film was a nominee for Tempo Documentary Award on Tempo Film Festival and  won the Stockholm Prize through Nöjesguiden. One year later it was awarded Newcomer of the year at Swedish Guldbaggegalan, and it won Best Swedish Feature – The City Of Gothenburg Award, at the  Gothenburg Film Festival.

References

External links

 Swedish Film Institute
 Tempo Filmfestival
 Fragility – Momentofilm

2016 films
2010s Swedish-language films
2016 documentary films
Swedish documentary films
2010s Swedish films